Margaret Anne Walshaw is a New Zealand education academic. She is currently a full professor at the Massey University.

Academic career
Walshaw completed a 1999 PhD titled Paradox, partiality and promise : a politics for girls in school mathematics at the Massey University and is on the editorial board of Springer journal, Journal of Mathematics Teacher Education.

Selected works 
 Walshaw, Margaret, and Glenda Anthony. "The teacher’s role in classroom discourse: A review of recent research into mathematics classrooms." Review of educational research, 78, no. 3 (2008): 516–551.
 Anthony, Glenda, and Margaret Walshaw. "Characteristics of effective teaching of mathematics: A view from the West." Journal of Mathematics Education, volume. 2 (2009): 147–164.
 Walshaw, Margaret. Working with Foucault in education. Sense Publishers, 2007.
 Anthony, Glenda, and Margaret Walshaw. Effective pedagogy in mathematics. Vol. 19. Belley, France: International Academy of Education, 2009.
 Walshaw, Margaret, ed. Mathematics education within the postmodern. IAP, 2004.

References

Living people
New Zealand women mathematicians
New Zealand women academics
Massey University alumni
Academic staff of the Massey University
New Zealand educational theorists
Year of birth missing (living people)